The men's 3500 metre walk race was held for the only time at the 1908 Summer Olympics in London. The competition was held on Tuesday, July 14, 1908. It was held in two rounds. There were three heats in the first round, with the top three in each heat advancing to the final.  25 racewalkers from eight nations competed. NOCs could enter up to 12 athletes.

Results

First round

Heat 1

Larner led the entire race.

Heat 2

Webb had little competition, leading from the start and winning by nearly 2 minutes.

Heat 3

As in the other two heats, the winner led from the beginning.  Unlike in the others, however, this race became close as Harrison made a late attempt to pass Goulding.  Goulding finished strongly to fend off Harrison, winning by 10 seconds.

Final

Webb, Goulding, and Harrison were the early leaders.  Harrison was disqualified shortly after Larner passed him.  By the end of the first mile, the top four spots had solidified into the final positions.  Larner had passed the field, bumping Webb to second place, while Kerr had managed to overtake Goulding.

References

Sources
 Official Report of the Games of the IV Olympiad (1908).
 De Wael, Herman. Herman's Full Olympians: "Athletics 1908". Accessed 31 March 2006.

Athletics at the 1908 Summer Olympics
Racewalking at the Olympics